HD 154088 is a seventh magnitude metal-rich K-type main sequence star that lies approximately 58 light-years away in the constellation of Ophiuchus. The star is orbited by a hot Super-Earth.

Properties
     
     
HD 154088 is a modestly bright star that lies at the bottom of Ophiuchus, near to the border with Scorpius and near to the plane of the Milky Way. The star was recognised as a high proper motion star during the last century, and early Earth-based parallax measurements such as that of the Gliese Catalogue of Nearby Stars indicated a distance of about 50 light-years.

The star has a spectral type of K0V, indicating that it is a main sequence star that is about 350 degrees cooler than the Sun. On the Hertzsprung-Russell diagram (left), the star lies slightly above the main sequence. This is because the star is very metal-rich; with an Fe/H of 0.3 dex the star has about twice the solar abundance of iron, which makes HD 154088 fall into the somewhat vague group of super metal-rich (SMR) stars. The giant planet occurrence rate of Fe/H = 0.3 stars is on the order of 30%, but HD 154088 is not currently known to host any giant planets.

HD 154088 has a pronounced magnetic field. It also has a magnetic cycle similar to the Sun, though its length is not well constrained.

The survey in 2015 have ruled out the existence of any additional stellar companions at projected distances from 8 to 119 astronomical units.

Planetary system
A planet orbiting HD 154088 discovered with the HARPS spectrograph was announced in September 2011. With a minimum mass of 6 Earth masses, the companion falls into the regime of Super-Earths.

HD 154088 is also being observed under the Keck Eta-Earth radial velocity survey. HD 154088 b is a close match for planet candidate 1 (orbital period = 18.1 days, minimum mass = 6.5 M🜨), so they may be the same detection. The planet existence was finally confirmed in 2021.

References

Ophiuchus (constellation)
Durchmusterung objects
154088
083541
0652
K-type main-sequence stars